The NXT Tag Team Championship is a professional wrestling tag team championship created and promoted by the American professional wrestling promotion WWE for their NXT brand. The inaugural championship team was British Ambition (Adrian Neville and Oliver Grey), who won a tournament final on the January 31, 2013 taping of NXT (aired February 13).

The Undisputed Era as a stable have the most reigns at three, while individually, stable member Kyle O'Reilly has the most reigns, also at three. The inaugural champions were British Ambition (Adrian Neville and Oliver Grey). The team with the longest reign is The Ascension (Conor O'Brian/Konnor and Rick Victor/Viktor), who held the title for 364 days, while the shortest reign belongs to Moustache Mountain (Tyler Bate and Trent Seven), who held the title for 2 days. However, due to tape delays, which are the dates that WWE recognizes for the NXT Tag Team Championship's history, they recognize that The Ascension's reign was 343 days and that Moustache Mountain's reign was 22 days, which remain the longest and shortest reigns, respectively. Tyler Bate was the youngest champion at 21, while Bobby Fish was the oldest at 42.

The current champions are Gallus (Mark Coffey and Wolfgang), who are in their first reign. They defeated previous champions The New Day (Kofi Kingston and Xavier Woods), Pretty Deadly (Elton Prince and Kit Wilson) and Chase University (Andre Chase and Duke Hudson) in a fatal four-way tag team match at NXT Vengeance Day on February 4, 2023 in Charlotte, North Carolina.

Title history

Combined reigns

By team

1

By wrestler

1

See also
Tag team championships in WWE

References

External links
Official NXT Tag Team Championship Title History

WWE NXT championships
WWE tag team champion lists